Eva Gustafsson (born 16 December 1954) is a Swedish former athlete (middle distance), who competed for the club Kil AIK and later (in the 1990s) SOK Sisu.

Personal bests
800 meters - 2.09.3 ( Karlstad 29 June 1976 )
1500 meters - 4.17.69 ( Stockholm 14 June 1977 )
3000 meters - 9.12.06 ( Stockholm 31 July 1974 )
5000 metes - 16.07.0 ( Jakobstad 30 May 1976 )
10000 meters - 35.40.82 ( Kristiansand Norway July 3, 1992 )
Half marathon - 1:18:33 ( Karlstad 16 September 1990 )
Marathon - 2:43:48 ( Karlstad 1 June 1991 )

References

 Much of the content of this article comes from the equivalent Swedish-language Wikipedia article (retrieved August 1, 2013).
 
 Sverigebästa Personliga rekord, födelsedatum (läst 2012-08-27)
 friidrott.se:s Stora Grabbar-sida
 Stora grabbars märke

Swedish female middle-distance runners
1954 births
Living people
Swedish female long-distance runners
Swedish female marathon runners